= A Cultural History of Youth in the Modern Age =

Book series

- Edited by: Stephanie Olsen and Heidi Morrison
- Language: English
- Discipline: History
- Publisher: Bloomsbury Publishing
- Published: 2023
- No. of books: 6

A Cultural History of Youth in the Modern Age is a six-volume book series about the development of the concept of youth from antiquity to contemporary Western society. It was generally edited by Stephanie Olsen and Heidi Morrison, and published by Bloomsbury Publishing in 2023. It is a sequel of Bloomsbury's 2010 six-volume A Cultural History of Childhood and Family series.
